In France, an  (AOTU; urban transport organisation authority) is a type of autorité organisatrice de transports (AOT) for urban areas.

To do so it receives funds raised via a transport tax on local businesses called the versement transport (VT).

There are several types of legal structure which these organisations by which AOTUs may be governed Traditionally, urban public transport was organised by the French communes, especially in the south of France. In 1999, commune-based organisations represented over 30% of all AOTUs. Since the 1970s, however, AOTs have tended to combine across communes, with the creation of numerous  (SIVUs; inter-commune single-purpose syndicates) with a remit only for the direction of urban transport. Between the end of the 1970s and 1999, 20% to 30% of AOTUs were SIVUs.

By 2004, 18% of all AOTUs were communes.

An AOTU can run the transport service itself (a ) or contract it out to another transport operator.

Public transport in France